Robert C. Word Ramspeck (September 5, 1890 – September 10, 1972) was an American politician and businessman.

Ramspeck was born in Decatur, Georgia. As a young man he was a federal police officer. He was admitted to the bar in 1920. He would go on to be a Democratic congressman from Georgia from 1929 to 1945. In the period of 1941 to 1945 he was House Majority Whip. He also was very active in air lines and resigned from the United States Congress in 1945 to pursue his involvement in Eastern Air Lines where he worked until 1966, as vice-president from 1953 to 1961 and later consultant. Ramspeck was also an active Civitan. Additionally, he served as chairman of the United States Civil Service Commission from March 16, 1951 until resigning on December 31, 1952. He died while on a visit to Castor, Louisiana, and was buried in Decatur Cemetery.

References

External links 
 
 
 

1890 births
1972 deaths
People from Decatur, Georgia
Democratic Party members of the United States House of Representatives from Georgia (U.S. state)
Georgia (U.S. state) lawyers
Eastern Air Lines
American police officers
20th-century American politicians
20th-century American lawyers